Trachelyopterus insignis is a species of catfish from the freshwater driftwood catfish family, Auchenipteridae. It is commonly found in rivers of northern South America, where it is called the chivo (lit. "goat"), the rengue, or the doncella (lit. "maiden").

Taxonomy and naming
The species was formally described in 1878 by the Austrian zoologist Franz Steindachner from Colombia's Rio Magdelena. Steindachner originally placed T. insignis in the genus Auchenipterus, another group of driftwood catfishes, and it has also been moved into Parauchenipterus, which is no longer considered valid.

Description

This catfish is sexually dimorphic. At a young age the sexes differ mainly in coloration; males are mottled, females are plain. Once sexual maturity is reached, however, males grow a large dorsal spine.
Males can reach a 20 cm total length.

Distribution and habitat

T. insignis is exclusively freshwater and is endemic to the lower Rio Magdalena river basin of Colombia.

Behavior
Like many other members of the driftwood catfishes, T. insignis is nocturnal, hiding in logs during the daytime, and venturing outside at night to feed.

Relationship with humans
According to the IUCN, T. insignis is not currently threatened in any  specific way, nor have any actions been taken to ensure its survival. Other studies have found it to have a low to moderate risk of extinction.

While not present in the freshwater aquarium trade, these fishes have been bred in captivity: with a gravel substrate and floating watersprite plants.

See also
 Trachelyopterus lucenai

References

External links 
 Fishbase.org entry

Catfish of South America
Freshwater fish of Colombia
Magdalena River
Taxa named by Franz Steindachner
Fish described in 1878